The flag of Abruzzo is one of the official symbols of the region of Abruzzo, Italy. The current flag was adopted on 21 May 1999.

Symbolism
The flag is the coat of arms of Abruzzo superimposed on a field of burgundy. White represents the snowy mountains, green the hills of the region, and blue the Adriatic sea.

History

References

Abruzzo
Abruzzo